Skirmett is a hamlet in the parish of Hambleden, in Buckinghamshire, England. 

It lies in the Hambleden Valley in the Chiltern Hills, between the villages of Hambleden and Fingest.

Toponymy
 The moot or meeting-place of the shire or district  

Skirmett : ( la Skire..mote  ) (1307) 

The name element Skire is from Old English scîr ( shire or district ).

The next element mote is from Old English môt ( moot or meeting-place ).

Local history

The simple flint church of All Saints dated from the mid-19th century and has now been deconsecrated and converted into a private house.

There is a line of brick and timber-framed cottages along one side of the road and just the one public house, The Frog, formerly known as The Kings Arms.

There used to be a police presence in the village, and the local policeman was housed with his family in Hope Cottage, but this was sold a good while ago and is now a private residence.

Gallery

Notes

Citations

Bibliography

Hamlets in Buckinghamshire
Hambleden